Edward James Richardson (born 22 July 1990) is an Irish cricketer. Richardson is a right-handed medium pace bowler who also bats right-handed. On 6 September 2013, Richardson made his One Day International debut for Ireland against Scotland. He made his Twenty20 cricket debut for Leinster Lightning in the 2017 Inter-Provincial Trophy on 26 May 2017. He made his first-class debut for Leinster Lightning in the 2017 Inter-Provincial Championship on 5 June 2017.

References

External links

1990 births
Living people
Irish cricketers
Ireland One Day International cricketers
Leinster Lightning cricketers
Munster Reds cricketers
People educated at Wesley College, Dublin
Sportspeople from County Louth